Anil C. Singh is an Indian lawyer designated as a senior advocate. He is serving as an additional solicitor general of India.

Career as a lawyer
As a lawyer, Singh has had a distinguished career spanning over three decades. 
In 2003, he was appointed as senior counsel by Central Government to conduct cases in the Bombay High Court for Union of India and also was appointed as special counsel to conduct cases for Brihanmumbai Municipal Corporation.

In 2010, Singh was elected as a member of the Bar Council of Maharashtra and Goa, by securing the highest votes in Mumbai. In 2011, Singh was unanimously elected as the chairman of the Bar Council of Maharashtra and Goa. In 2012, Singh was designated as senior advocate by Hon'ble Bombay High Court.

He is serving as an additional solicitor general of India.

In 2020, he has been re-appointed for the third time in a row by an appointment committee of the cabinet headed by the prime minister of India.

References

Additional Solicitors General of India
Senior Advocates in India
Living people
Year of birth missing (living people)
Place of birth missing (living people)
20th-century Indian lawyers